The Mausoleum of Prince Ernst in Stadthagen, Lower Saxony, is a mausoleum erected by Ernst of Schaumburg (d. 1622) and his widow Hedwig of Hesse-Kassel in the years 1620–1627. Its unusual architecture and the resurrection monument by Adrian de Vries make it a site of European rank. The crypt was used as burial place of the House of Schaumburg and the House of Schaumburg-Lippe until 1915.

The mausoleum, attached to the chancel of Stadthagen parish church St. Martini, is a domed heptagon in Italian renaissance style designed by Giovanni Maria Nosseni. Four of its walls are furnished with Latin inscribed epitaphs for Prince Ernst, his parents, and his wife, framed by aediculas with Italian marble columns. The central monument by Adriaen de Vries consists of a huge pedestal bearing the cenotaph of Prince Ernst – simultaneously conceived as the tomb of Christ: the cenotaph is surrounded by four drowsing Roman guards, and a larger-than-life figure of Christ triumphant surmounts its top. The dome, painted with fourteen musician angels, represents heaven.

Burials in the crypt 
Philip I, Count of Schaumburg-Lippe
Landgravine Sophie of Hesse-Kassel
Frederick Christian, Count of Schaumburg-Lippe
Philip II, Count of Schaumburg-Lippe
Countess Eleonore Luise (1781–1783)
George William, Prince of Schaumburg-Lippe
Adolf I, Prince of Schaumburg-Lippe
Princess Hermine of Waldeck and Pyrmont
Princess Ida of Schaumburg-Lippe
Prince Hermann of Schaumburg-Lippe (1848–1928)

External links 

 Renaissance-Stadthagen Homepage (in German)

Mausoleums in Germany
Buildings and structures in Schaumburg
Cenotaphs in Germany
Lutheran churches in Lower Saxony
Religious buildings and structures completed in 1627
1627 establishments in the Holy Roman Empire
17th-century establishments in the Holy Roman Empire
Burial sites of the House of Lippe
Bronze sculptures in Germany
Sculptures depicting New Testament people
Mannerist architecture
Renaissance architecture in Germany